Yeliyur is a village in Mandya district, Karnataka state, India.

Transportation
Yeliyur has a passenger railway station on the Mysore–Bangalore railway line.

Economy
The economy is chiefly agrarian. Cultivation is dependent upon irrigation from canals fed by the Cauvery river. Syndicate bank has opened a branch here.

There is a post office and the postal code is 571402.

See also
 Jakkanahalli
 Chinya
 Naganahalli
 Pandavapura
 Byadarahalli

References

Villages in Mandya district